Hough Green is a residential area of the town of Widnes, within the borough of Halton, in the ceremonial county of Cheshire, England. Historically, it was part of Lancashire until 1974. From 2014, Hough Green became a part of the Liverpool City Region.
 
Transportation is good with a Bus Link to the centre of Widnes. Hough Green railway station has rail links to nearby Liverpool, being on the Merseyrail metro, Widnes and further afield to Manchester and Warrington.

See also
 Hough Green railway station

References

Populated places in Cheshire
Widnes